The France women's water polo team is a water polo team that represents France at water polo competitions.

Results

Olympic Games
2024 – Qualified as host country

World Championship

1991 – 9th place
1994 – 9th place
2003 – 15th place
2015 – 14th place
2017 – 11th place
2022 – 8th place

European Championship

1985 – 7th place
1987 – 3rd place
1989 – 3rd place
1991 – 4th place
1993 – 5th place
1995 – 5th place
1997 – 8th place
1999 – 8th place
2001 – 8th place
2008 – 8th place
2014 – 7th place
2016 – 7th place
2018 – 7th place
2020 – 7th place
2022 – 7th place

Current squad
Roster for the 2020 Women's European Water Polo Championship.

Head coach: Florian Bruzzo

Under-20 team
France lastly competed at the 2021 FINA Junior Water Polo World Championships.

References

External links

Women's water polo in France
Women's national water polo teams
W